Nanadi is a village in Chikodi taluka Belgaum district of Karnataka, India.There are few old temples such as ;
1. Halsiddhnath Temple
2. Maruti Temple
3. Mahadev Temple
4. Vittal Rukmini temple
5. Lakxmi Temple
6. Thaloba Temple
7. Jyotiba Temple
8. Majjid

References

Villages in Belagavi district